Halle Brothers building at Shaker Square is a former department store building constructed in 1948 for the Halle Brothers Co. in the Shaker Square section of Cleveland, Ohio. Designed by architect Robert A. Little, it is listed on the National Register of Historic Places.

References

Commercial buildings completed in 1948
Buildings and structures in Cleveland
Commercial buildings on the National Register of Historic Places in Ohio
National Register of Historic Places in Cleveland, Ohio
Buckeye-Shaker
Department stores on the National Register of Historic Places